Chheda is a Hindu surname. Notable people with the surname include:

Janvi Chheda (born 1984), Indian model and television actress
Tanay Chheda (born 1996), Indian actor
Tarachand Chheda (born 1951), Indian politician

See also
Chhuta Chheda, Indian soap opera

Hindu surnames